The Monster Society of Evil is a supervillain team created by Otto Binder and C. C. Beck for Fawcett Comics. It is led by Mister Mind against their mutual enemy Captain Marvel. The team is significant as one of the first supervillain teams in comics to contain villains that a superhero had fought previously; prior to this, supervillain teams were composed of villains created just for that storyline. In fact, the Monster Society consists of every major enemy Captain Marvel had ever faced.

The Monster Society of Evil made its debut in Captain Marvel Adventures #22, and the resulting "Monster Society of Evil" story arc continued for two years in Captain Marvel Adventures, ending with issue #46 (May 1945).

Publication history

Fawcett Comics
"The Monster Society of Evil" was published in 25 chapters in Fawcett Comics' Captain Marvel Adventures comic book. Its serialized format was inspired by the success of the live-action serial adaptation of the Captain Marvel strip, Adventures of Captain Marvel, by Republic Pictures in 1941. Chapter One of "The Monster Society of Evil" in Captain Marvel Adventures #22 (1943) depicted Captain Marvel learning that a criminal genius known only as "Mister Mind" - and only heard as a voice over a radio receiver - had gathered many of Marvel's other rogues - including Captain Nazi, Doctor Sivana, Ibac, Nippo, Mister Banjo, and more - to form "The Monster Society of Evil". After a brief appearance in issue #26, the mastermind Mister Mind is eventually revealed in Captain Marvel Adventures #27 to be a cartoonish alien worm with spectacles and a talkbox around his neck to amplify his voice.

"The Monster Society of Evil" serial concluded with Captain Marvel Adventures #46 (1945), in which Mind is finally captured, tried, and executed.

As the first and longest serialized story arc in comic book history, "The Monster Society of Evil" was hailed as a milestone of the Golden Age of Comics. Individual chapters would later be reprinted, after the Captain Marvel characters were acquired from Fawcett by DC Comics in 1972, in various collections under the trademark Shazam! In 1989, American Nostalgia Library reprinted the serial as The Monster Society of Evil – Deluxe Limited Collector's Edition. Compiled by Mike Higgs, the collection was an oversized, slipcased hardcover book strictly limited to 3,000 numbered copies.

Fictional team history

Earth-Two version
When Mister Mind came to Earth-Two, he formed the first Monster Society of Evil, which was merely a shadow of what was to come. He gathered known villains like Dummy, Mister Who, Nyola, Oom the Mighty, and Ramulus to make up the Monster Society of Evil. They succeeded in capturing Hawkgirl. Not long after its founding, the other villains tried to kill him and Mister Mind retreated to Earth-S. Without his leadership, the team was quickly defeated in battle by the All-Star Squadron.

Earth-S versions

First Earth-S version
When Mister Mind was transported to Earth-S, recruited supervillains, armies, and entire alien species to aid him in his attempt to conquer the Earth, and first relayed his information from the planetoid Punkus via radio. He began his reign of terror on Earth in 1943, boasting that he and the Monster Society of Evil would give Captain Marvel "nightmares from now on". This formed the basis of the plot for "The Monster Society of Evil" serial in Captain Marvel Adventures #22–46 (March 1943 to May 1945). Mind was not revealed as a worm until Captain Marvel Adventures #26. Mind had many and varied plans to conquer Earth, and to destroy Captain Marvel and/or his teenaged alter-ego, Billy Batson. But Captain Marvel stopped all of Mind's plans, dismantled all of his resources, and arrested, frightened away, or accidentally killed all of his henchmen. Reverse cliffhangers were used in the Monster Society stories, such as Mister Mind about to be crushed under a careless heel or about to be crushed in a paper roller. Finally, a desperate Mister Mind attacked Captain Marvel's alter ego Billy Batson with ether and left him unconscious. But he then realized that without his henchmen, he was practically helpless and unable to kill him. Captain Marvel soon captured the world's wickedest worm and had him tried and executed for killing 186,744 people.

Second Earth-S version
Mister Mind's alien physiology proved resistant to the high voltage, and he entered a state of suspended animation that was mistaken for death. On the verge of being stuffed for display in a museum, he awakened, hypnotized the taxidermist into creating a duplicate, and escaped. Several future issues of Shazam! depict Mister Mind attempting to recruit new henchmen and reform the Monster Society of Evil, at one point even recruiting a displaced Lex Luthor from Earth-One. The Monster Society of Evil was briefly reformed in Shazam! #14 (September–October 1974).

An escaped Mister Mind, hungry for revenge, assembled a new, smaller group which included Doctor Sivana, his evil children Georgia and Sivana Jr, and Ibac. They attempted to attack the Marvel Family - Captain Marvel, Mary Marvel, and Captain Marvel Jr. - with a death ray that created "dream" monsters using first evil thoughts and later the nightmares of Uncle Marvel. The Marvels end up defeating the Monster Society by convincing Uncle Marvel to dream up "dream" versions of the Marvels to fight the monsters.

Third Earth-S version
Mister Mind reformed his Monster Society of Evil one last time in the classic continuity. Their wicked plans were wide-ranging, beginning with an assault on Egypt, expanding to a scheme to reverse the entire Earth's topography, Oggar raising an evil army from the sands and dusts of Egypt for Black Adam to lead, and conquering hundreds of planets and using them to build an army of spaceships. Their plans culminated in a massive assault on the Rock of Eternity, home of the Marvels' benefactor Shazam.

DC Rebirth version
In DC Rebirth, Mister Mind and Doctor Sivana plan to head to the Monsterlands in order to build the Monster Society of Evil from its inhabitants. As King Kid fights the Shazam Family in Philadelphia, Doctor Sivana and Mister Mind are directed to a boat by Dummy who cannot accompany them since he cannot deal with water. When they arrive at the Dungeon of Eternity, Mister Mind states that the inmates of the Dungeon of Eternity were gathered from all over the Magiclands and imprisoned for challenging the Council of Wizards. In addition, Mister Mind stated that the Monsterlands used to be called the Gods' Realm until the day of Black Adam's betrayal which led them to strip the gods of their powers and close the doors to the Magiclands. They find a small prison containing Superboy-Prime in the Monsterlands as Superboy-Prime states that he can hear what Mister Mind is saying. Mister Mind and Doctor Sivana begin their plans to free the Monster Society of Evil from the Dungeon of Eternity. Mister Mind senses the fight between the Shazam Family and Mamaragan as he instructs Doctor Sivana to stab his magical eye with a dagger that starts to melt the doors to the cells holding the Monster Society of Evil. Then Mister Mind started to control C.C. revealing to Billy that he is using him as a host and not Doctor Sivana. Mister Mind states to the Shazam Family that he plans to use C.C. to unite the Magiclands under his rule. He then proceeds to summon the Monster Society of Evil leaving Dummy behind who is tricked by Superboy-Prime into freeing him. As Shazam fights the Mister Mind-controlled C.C. Batson, King Kull states to the rest of the Monster Society of Evil to leave the women to him while Mister Merry-Go-Round states that he "gets the youngest to play with" which is what they agreed on. Mary tricks King Kull into attacking the three-headed Crocodile-Man, Freddy fights Jeepers and the Wicked Witch of the West, Darla dodges Evil Eye's attack, and Pedro is in a strength battle with Mister Atom that Mister Atom calls "Man vs. Machine." When Red Queen and Scapegoat want a turn, Mister Mind states that they will get their chance once the Magiclands are united. The Monster Society of Evil starts subduing the Shazam Family one by one. The Monster Society of Evil witnesses the spell used to unite the Seven Magiclands being cast. As the Monster Society of Evil continues their fight with the Shazam Family, Scapegoat noted to Red Queen that Black Adam was supposed to be part of the group as Red Queen states that Black Adam refused to follow Mister Mind while having plans to get revenge on Alice and Dorothy Gale. When Scapegoat mentions his plans to get revenge on Mayor Krunket, Superboy-Prime crashes the fight where he uses his fists to impale Scapegoat. The rest of the Shazam Family continues fighting the Monster Society of Evil which is watched by Mamaragan. When Shazam punches Mister Mind's talkbox, magic energy is emitted which knocks out the Monster Society of Evil. Once the spell that Mister Mind had cast was undone, the Shazam Family had the Monster Society of Evil remanded to Rock Falls Penitentiary where the Shazam Family built a special section to contain magical threats.

Monster Society of Evil membership

First version
  Mister Mind (leader) – A two-inch talking worm with telepathic powers and a genius intellect.
 Dummy – A living ventriloquist's dummy who was a recurring enemy of Vigilante.
 Mister Who – A crippled criminal mastermind with one working eye who created Solution Z which grants him the abilities of shapeshifting, size-shifting, invisibility, limb regeneration, phasing, and an amphibious nature. An early adversary of Doctor Fate.
 Nyola – A weather-controlling Aztec priestess who previously fought Hawkman.
 Oom the Mighty – A super-strong animated large statue with magical powers who was an early adversary of Spectre.
 Ramulus – A green-skinned supervillain with the ability to control plants who was an early opponent of Sandman and Sandy the Golden Boy.

Second version
 Mister Mind (leader)– A two-inch talking worm with telepathic powers and a genius intellect.
 Adolf Hitler – He and all the resources of Nazi Germany have assisted the Monster Society of Evil. Adolf Hitler was the one who gave the orders to create Captain Nazi.
 Archibald – A satyr and graduate of the Monster School who helped Mister Mind capture Billy Batson.
 An army of termites and worms.
 Artificial Bodies: Artificial bodies Mister Mind could mentally inhabit and which were used to fool Captain Marvel as he searched for Mister Mind on his asteroid base, consisting of:
 Goat-Man – A humanoid goat creature who was the first recruit of the Monster Society of Evil.
 A seemingly indestructible robot.
 A giant purple octopus with a grinning human face.
 A circus strongman with strength rivaling that of Captain Marvel himself.
 Benito Mussolini – He and all the resources of Fascist Italy have assisted the Monster Society of Evil.
 Bonzo – A hunchback human with large eyes and fangs.
 Captain Nazi – A superstrong Nazi warrior who assisted in the first plot.
 Crocodile-Men – A race of humanoid crocodiles from the planetoid Punkus.
 Herkimer – A Crocodile-Man who is Mister Mind's second-in-command and briefly took command of the Society when Mister Mind lost his memory, but later reformed and started working in the circus.
 Jorrk – The greatest scientist of the Crocodile-Men and one of Mister Mind's three lieutenants, alongside Dr. Smashi and Herr Phoul.
 Sylvester – A Crocodile-Man and one of Mister Mind's preferred gunners.
 Dobbin – Mister Mind's seahorse steed.
 Dome Attendants – Creatures that tend to Mister Mind's undersea base. It consists of a Pig Man, a Goblin, a Werewolf, an Ogre, and a midget submarine captain. The midget was the last of Mister Mind's minions to leave him.
 Dr. Smashi – A short Japanese scientist and one of Mister Mind's three lieutenants, alongside Jorrk and Herr Phoul.
 Dr. Hashi – A spiky-haired Japanese scientist.
 Dr. Peeyu – A tall Japanese scientist.
 Doctor Sivana – The "world's wickedest scientist".
 Evil Eye – A green-skinned humanoid monster with the ability to hypnotize.
 Herr Phoul – A bald Nazi scientist with a monocle and one of Mister Mind's three lieutenants alongside Jorkk and Dr. Smashi.
 Hideki Tojo – He and all the resources of Imperial Japan have assisted the Monster Society of Evil.
 Hydra – A serpentine monster with multiple heads that can regenerate. It was created by Mister Mind.
 Ibac – A criminal who sold his soul to Lucifer for super-strength and durability which he gets by saying the magic word "Ibac".
 Jeepers – The last of a race of bat monsters.
 Marmaduke – A criminal with big ears and a fat face.
 Monster Brigade – Undersea monsters under Mister Mind's command consisting of a sperm whale, a gigantic octopus, a hammerhead shark, and a huge sea serpent.
 Monster Professors – Teachers at Mister Mind's Monster School. It consists of a human, a Crocodile-Man, an unspecified fanged monster, and a humanoid with the head of a hippopotamus.
 Monster Students – Pupils at the Monster School that consist of tough humans, Crocodile-Men, and a horned black demon.
 Mr. Banjo – A criminal and leaker of Allied secrets via coded music from his banjo that were played on a popular radio show (only appears for one panel in the first chapter)
 Nippo – A master of disguise, master swordsman, and spy for the Japanese.
 Synthetic Animals – Fake animals created by Mister Mind. They consisted of Oscar (a giant lobster), Oliver (a gigantic octopus with human hands), Ophelius (a huge ram), and Oliphant (a dragon).
 Tough Guys – Generic human enforcers of Mister Mind's wishes. The notable ones include a Tommy-gun wielder, a cloaked swordsman, a beret-wearer, a stereotypical "Goomba", and a Gatsby cap-wearer.

Third version
 Mister Mind (leader)
 Doctor Sivana
 Ibac
 Georgia Sivana – Dr. Sivana's youngest daughter.
 Thaddeus Sivana Jr. – Dr. Sivana's youngest son.

Fourth version
 Mister Mind (leader)
 Doctor Sivana
 Ibac
 Black Adam – A traitorous first of the Marvels with powers similar to the others, but from the Egyptian gods.
 King Kull – The last of the Beast-Men that once ruled the Earth until Cro-Magnon man rebelled, causing him to go into suspended animation. He has enormous strength and durability and a brilliant mind, along with bizarre technology.
 Mister Atom – An indestructible and super-strong genocidal robot, who possesses the power of an atomic bomb.
 Oggar – An immortal sorcerer of great power with strength and durability matching Captain Marvel. Although his spells do not directly work on females.
 The inhabitants of 247 planets – Different alien races that were forced by Doctor Sivana and Ibac to work for them and build their fleet.

Fifth version
 Mister Mind (leader) - A worm from the Wildlands. He is revealed to be controlling C.C. Batson.
 Doctor Sivana - A mad scientist from the Earthlands.
 Crocodile-Men - A three-headed anthropomorphic crocodile in prison attire from the Wildlands.
 Dummy - A Victorian man-turned-ventriolquist's dummy who was exiled to the Monsterlands following a fight with the "heroes of yesterday." He was double-crossed by Superboy-Prime.
 Evil Eye - A large one-eyed green monster with tentacles from the Monsterlands.
 Jeepers - A bat monster from the Darklands.
 King Kull - The last of the Beast-Men from the Earthlands.
 Mister Atom - A giant robot from the Gamelands.
 Mister Merry-Go-Round - A villain from the Funlands.
 Red Queen - A queen in red from the Wozenderlands.
 Scapegoat - An anthropomorphic goat from the Wildlands. Killed by Superboy-Prime.
 Wicked Witch of the West - An evil green-skinned witch in an eyepatch from the Wozenderlands.

The Secret Code of the Monster Society
"The Secret Code of the Monster Society" was frequently referred to in the comic book. As early as the Fawcett comic, readers could mail away for a decoder key for the Monster Society and read the secret messages in the book by translating the messages given to them according to the substitution cipher. The cipher is very basic, in that the ciphertext alphabet is actually the regular English alphabet backwards.

During The Power of Shazam! ongoing series in the 1990s, when Mister Mind and the Monster Society of Evil were re-introduced in Post-Crisis continuity, DC Comics had done a similar thing as readers could mail away for a decoder card for the "Venusian Language" and read the secret messages. Similar to Kryptonian and Interlac, this was a cipher based on an "alien" alphabet. Various alien characters in DC Comics have been seen using it since.

Jeff Smith used the original 1940s Monster Society code in his Shazam!: The Monster Society of Evil miniseries, even titling the miniseries' four chapters with ciphered text. DC Comics' official website provides an on-line tool to cipher and un-cipher the messages.

Other versions
 In Superman #276 (June 1974), an analogy to Captain Marvel from Earth-276 appears named Captain Thunder who is given a compulsion to commit evil acts by his enemies the Monster League of Evil. This League includes Count Dracula, Frankenstein's monster, the Wolf-Man, and the Mummy.
 In Mark Waid and Alex Ross's 1996 miniseries Kingdom Come, many of the prisoners in Superman's gulag were members of the Pre-Crisis incarnations of the Monster Society of Evil such as Jeepers, Mister Banjo, King Kull, the Crocodile-Men, Ibac, and Goat-Man.

In other media
 The Monster Society of Evil appears in the Batman: The Brave and the Bold episode "The Malicious Mister Mind!", consisting of Mister Mind, Doctor Sivana, Mister Atom, Kru'll the Eternal, Ibac, Jeepers, Oom the Mighty, and an unnamed Crocodile-Man.
 The Monster Society of Evil appears in Lego DC: Shazam!: Magic and Monsters, consisting of Mister Mind, Doctor Sivana, Oom the Mighty, a Crocodile-Man, Dummy, and Jeepers.

References

Further reading
 The Monster Society of Evil – Deluxe Limited Collector's Edition (1989). Compiled and designed by Mike Higgs. Reprints the entire The Monster Society of Evil story arc that ran for two years from Captain Marvel Adventures #22–46 (from 1943 to 1945) where Captain Marvel meets Mister Mind and his Monster Society of Evil. This oversized, slipcased hardcover book was strictly limited to 3,000 numbered copies. Published by American Nostalgia Library, an imprint of Hawk Books Limited.
 The Complete Original Monster Society of Evil: Gwandanaland Comics #1679—Captain Marvel Must Battle Against His Worst Enemies Banded Together!—From Captain Marvel Adventures #22–46.  Reprints the entire story utilizing scanned images of the pages from the original published comic books.  Published by Gwandanaland Comics, a print-on-demand publisher. 

External links
 Who's Who entry at the Marvel Family Web
Monster Society of Evil at Comic Vine
 Chapters 1–11 of the original Monster Society serial
 Chapters 12–25

Characters created by C. C. Beck
DC Comics supervillain teams
Captain Marvel (DC Comics)